František Lády (born 6 April 1997) is a Slovak footballer who plays for Dunajská Lužná as a forward.

Club career

ŠK Slovan Bratislava
Lády made his professional debut for Slovan Bratislava against FO ŽP Šport Podbrezová on 20 May 2016.

Dunajská Lužná
In 2019, Lády joined OFK Dunajská Lužná.

References

External links
 ŠK Slovan Bratislava official club profile
 
 Futbalnet profile

1996 births
Living people
Slovak footballers
Association football forwards
ŠK Slovan Bratislava players
FC Petržalka players
Slovak Super Liga players
Footballers from Bratislava